The molecular formula C5H8O3 may refer to:

 Butylene carbonates
 1,2-Butylene carbonate
 cis-2,3-Butylene carbonate
 trans-2,3-Butylene carbonate
 Hydroxyethyl acrylate
 α-Ketoisovaleric acid
 α-Ketovaleric acid
 Levulinic acid
 3-Oxopentanoic acid
 Tetrahydro-2-furoic acid